Palmer Inlet is an ice-filled inlet  long, lying between Cape Bryant and Cape Musselman along the east coast of Palmer Land. Essentially rectangular in shape, it is bordered by almost vertical cliffs. Discovered by members of East Base of the United States Antarctic Service (USAS) who explored this coast by land and from the air in 1940. Named for Robert Palmer, assistant to the meteorologist at the East Base.

See also
Foster Peninsula

References

Inlets of Palmer Land